Berlin Brandenburg Airport Willy Brandt is an international airport in Schönefeld, just south of the German capital Berlin in the state of Brandenburg. It mostly has flights to European metropolitan and leisure destinations as well as a number of intercontinental services.

The new airport replaced Tempelhof, Schönefeld, and Tegel airports, and became the single commercial airport serving Berlin and the surrounding State of Brandenburg, an area with a combined 6 million inhabitants. With projected annual passenger numbers of around 34 million, Berlin Brandenburg Airport has become the third busiest airport in Germany, surpassing Düsseldorf Airport and making it one of the fifteen busiest in Europe.

At the time of opening, the airport has a theoretical capacity of 46 million passengers per year. Terminal 1 accounts for 28 million of this; Terminal 2, which did not open until 24 March 2022 due to the COVID-19 pandemic, accounts for 6 million; and Terminal 5, the terminal buildings of the former Berlin-Schönefeld Airport, accounts for another 12 million. Planned further expansion would bring the airports total annual capacity to 58 million passengers by 2035.

The airport was originally planned to open in October 2011, five years after starting construction in 2006. The project encountered a series of successive delays due to poor construction planning, execution, management, and corruption. Berlin Brandenburg Airport finally received its operational licence in May 2020, and opened for commercial traffic on 31 October 2020, 14 years after construction started and 29 years after official planning was begun. Schönefeld's refurbished passenger facilities were incorporated as Terminal 5 on 25 October 2020 while all other airlines completed the transition from Tegel to Berlin Brandenburg Airport by 8 November 2020.

History

Plans for a new Berlin Airport

After the fall of the Berlin Wall in 1989, and following German reunification in 1990, Berlin once again became the German federal capital; leaders made plans to recognise the city's increased importance by constructing a large commercial airport. The existing airports, Tegel Airport, Schönefeld Airport and Tempelhof Airport, were ageing and becoming increasingly congested due to rising passenger numbers. To ensure the economic viability of the project, they pursued the single airport concept: the new airport would become the sole commercial airport for Berlin and Brandenburg. They planned to close Tegel, Schönefeld and Tempelhof upon opening the new airport, then ban commercial aviation from any other airport in Brandenburg.

On 2 May 1991, the Berlin Brandenburg Flughafen Holding GmbH (BBF) was founded, owned by the states of Berlin and Brandenburg (37% each) and the Federal Republic of Germany (the remaining 26%). Eberhard Diepgen, Mayor of Berlin, became the first chairman of the supervisory board.  The holding company announced on 20 June 1993 that Sperenberg Airfield, Jüterbog Airfield and the area south of Schönefeld Airport, where the evaluation of the locations Sperenberg, Jüterbog East, Jüterbog West, Tietzow, Michelsdorf, Borkheide and Schönefeld South was carried out according to five criteria with different weighting. Each site was advocated by various factions in the ensuing political discussion. With regard to land-use planning and noise pollution, rural Sperenberg and Jüterbog were considered more suitable for construction of a large airport. Economic considerations favoured an airport located near the city centre, with existing road and rail links (as is the case with Schönefeld).

On 28 May 1996, Mayor Diepgen, Minister-President of Brandenburg Manfred Stolpe and Federal Minister for Transport Matthias Wissmann committed to Schönefeld as the site for the new airport. This so-called consensus decision was later affirmed by the respective state legislatures. The new airport would use some infrastructure, such as a runway, from the existing Schönefeld Airport.

Failed privatisation
Originally, BBF anticipated that the new airport would be owned and operated by a private investor. They called for proposals, which led to two bidding consortia emerging as serious contenders. One was led by Hochtief through its Hochtief Airport subsidiary and included ABB, Fraport and Bankengesellschaft Berlin as partners.  The other consortium comprised IVG, Flughafen Wien AG, Dorsch-Consult, Commerzbank and Caisse des Dépôts. On 19 September 1998, BBF announced that the Hochtief consortium were the successful bidder. This saw them granted exclusive authority to negotiate the terms and conditions for an acquisition of the Berlin Brandenburg Airport holding and the construction and operation of the new airport for 50 years.

On 31 March 1999, BBF officially commissioned Hochtief and its partners to construct the new airport, causing IVG to file a lawsuit. The Brandenburg Oberlandesgericht acknowledged the concerns voiced by IVG. In its review, it found that in certain points the assessment of the applications had been biased towards Hochtief. This led to annulment of the contract award on 3 August of that year.

Hochtief Airport and IVG teamed up and created a plan for a joint bid on 10 November 2000 in an attempt to receive the contract to construct and operate the new airport. At the time BBF hoped that the planning approval could be completed in 2002, with the tentative opening in 2007.

When Hochtief/IVG submitted its bid in February 2002, the BBF board consisted of Manfred Stolpe, who would become Federal Minister of Transportation; Klaus Wowereit, who replaced Eberhard Diepgen as Mayor of Berlin and chair of the board; and Matthias Platzeck, who replaced Stolpe as Minister-President of Brandenburg. The board determined that the proposal would not be practical and voted 22 May 2003 to scrap the privatisation plan. Hochtief and IVG received approximately €50 million compensation for their planning effort.

Public ownership and construction permit
The new Berlin airport would be planned, owned and operated by BBF Holding. Shortly afterwards BBF Holding became Flughafen Berlin Brandenburg GmbH (FBB) and remained under the ownership of Berlin, Brandenburg and the federal government. On 13 August 2004, the Brandenburg state ministry for infrastructure and regional policy granted approval for the development of Schönefeld Airport into the new Berlin Brandenburg International Airport.

A legal battle ensued, as local residents filed lawsuits against the ministry's decision. The dispute ended 16 March 2006, when the Federal Administrative Court of Germany rejected the residents' arguments. The court imposed stipulations on flight operations at the new airport. The construction permit was granted only under the condition that once operational, the number of people living in the approach path would be lower compared to the situation surrounding the three existing airports – Tegel, Schönefeld and Tempelhof. Therefore, it was mandatory for Tegel and Schönefeld to close (Tempelhof was already decommissioned in 2008) once Berlin's air traffic was concentrated at the new airport.

Financing
By 2009, the construction cost was budgeted at €2.83 billion. FBB raised the financing for the project by a credit raising of €2.4 billion, a bank deposit of €430 million by the FBB partners, and an additional €440 million of equity capital provided by FBB.

During construction, it became clear that the airport would become significantly more expensive due to underestimating the actual costs, construction flaws and increased expenses for soundproofing nearby homes. By 2012, the series of delays in opening was expected to lead to a number of lawsuits against FBB with the now defunct Air Berlin announcing its intentions of such a move.

By late 2012, expenditures for Berlin Brandenburg Airport totalled €4.3 billion, almost twice the originally anticipated figure.

It became clear in November 2015 that the financial concept of the airport was fundamentally flawed. The main purpose of the many stores planned at the airport was to serve passengers who were changing planes, assuming that Berlin would be a big international hub. It was acknowledged in 2015 that competition between the hubs was already too intense. Frankfurt Airport and London Heathrow would resist losing passenger shares without a price war and that few if any airlines would abandon their hubs for Berlin. The only remaining potential airline for operating a hub was Air Berlin, which was in financial difficulties and did not plan to provide long-distance service.

German Railways Deutsche Bahn also sued for non-usage of the ghost station below the airport in 2012 with the airport having to pay damages.

In November 2015, auditors with the Brandenburg Comptroller concluded that financial control executed by Berlin, Brandenburg, and Germany over the airport as owners was insufficient and inefficient. The Comptroller published a 400-page report in February 2016 describing the flawed opening including several construction lapses. This led the BER boss to retaliate publicly against the comptroller on 27 February decrying the release of the numbers.

Soundproofing nearby homes will be €50million more expensive due to a verdict of the main administrative courts of the states of Berlin and Brandenburg. As of 5 May 2016, the court decided in favour of 25,500 plaintiffs. See also: Federal Administrative Court of Germany. The key directive of the verdict was that rooms must be provided with adequate ventilation if windows are closed due to noise, and the airport authority must also determine how air inside the structures can be vented. The airport avoided liability claims against Imtech and other firms involved in the construction of the fire exhaust system.

Financing for the entire airport appeared headed toward bankruptcy in June 2016 due to the EU's unwillingness to approve a pending request for €2.5billion bringing the project to €6.9billion. If the request was denied, the airport authority stated it would be bankrupt by August 2016. The EU permitted an additional €2.2billion on 3 August 2016. A €2.4 billion loan was signed on 13 February 2017 containing €1.1 billion for financing and €1.3 billion to resolve old bad loans. The German federal government and the states of Berlin and Brandenburg guaranteed the debt.

As of 2015, total costs amounted to €5.4 billion. Revised plans suggest additional costs amounting to an extra €2.19 billion. As of 3 June 2015, Germany applied for an additional €2.5 billion spending approval from the EU. This is in addition to the previous total of €4.3 billion, bringing total costs to €6.8 billion. The EU would only permit an additional €2.2 billion, which it did on 3 August 2016. Although the airport has yet to open officials are planning a possible third runway for approximately €1 billion and other new projects such as an additional terminal, expanded baggage system and another freight facility. The total additional spending would amount to €3.2 billion. The board warned of a further rise in costs because the airport will not open before 2017. The current time-cost frame is limited to 2016; the estimated cost of €6.9 billion is current as of May 2016. The airport company reportedly made the assurance to the European Investment Bank that the airport will open in September 2019. Forecasts estimate the airport will not be ready to open until 2020. This required €500 million refinancing to bridge the gap between 2019 and 2020. The airport published a need for another billion euros up until 2020. Thus the three years of work from 2018 onwards will cost at least €900 million. The total cost of the airport will top €6.5 billion.

As of 13 January 2018, the company requested an additional €2.8 billion for extensions until 2030. Taking that into account, the total cost comes to €9.4 billion, with a total of €10.3 billion if the €900 million in overhead costs previously mentioned are factored in. An economical estimate determined the costs for the overheads at a conservative figure of €770 million. The airport is planning to borrow €400 million. Another issue arose when it became public that the airport head earns an annual salary of €500,000. A new loan was granted by the German parliament on 30 June 2018 totalling €132 million. The other two owners, the states of Brandenburg and Berlin, will likely permit their shares of the loan as well, so the loan will total €500 million. The board postponed a decision concerning the loan until the end of August 2018, which leaves the entire finance planning in jeopardy. At the end of August 2018 Berlin's head of finance Matthias Kollatz remarked that the airport may face abrupt bankruptcy on 1 January 2019 if no immediate measures were be taken. The financial head resigned from the holding company of Berlin's airports at the end of September 2019. According to projections the airport is in dire need of additional €508 million from 2021 onwards. There seems to be another need for financial support from authorities for the next 2 years as of 29 April 2020 amounting to €1.8 billion. A new study claimed that the net worth of the current building is far lower than the credited €4,866 million and it is to be settled at €3 billion less. The financial gap due to the COVID-19 pandemic is estimated to be at €300 million for Tegel and Schönefeld combined, thus the new airport will be in need for financial support for years to come. The annual manager report of 2019 of BER's operating firm was criticised by Linkspartei as extremely short and intransparent. Cash flow concerns amount to a dire need of €1.5 billion as of immediate in 20 June.

On 13 July 2020, prosecutors filed a complaint on suspicion of falsifying the balance sheet. The financial auditors for FBB were the same as for the now insolvent Wirecard company, raising doubts about the validity of the audits. The plan to generate profits starting in 2023/2024 has been overturned by the COVID-19 pandemic according to airport head .

There seems to be a demand of €375 million for 2021 to cover current costs for BER, the parent company announced on 9 October 2020. An additional €552 million are needed as a stabilization for missing passengers.

Naming

During much of the planning and construction phase the new airport was known as Berlin Brandenburg International Airport, abbreviated BBI. It was then discovered that the IATA code BBI already referred to Biju Patnaik Airport (also known as Bhubaneswar Airport) in India. When the planned opening date of 2 June 2012 drew nearer the FBB launched a marketing campaign introducing the BER branding, reflecting the new airport code.

In 2007, the FBB board decided that Berlin Brandenburg Airport would be given a second name, honouring a person with a distinctive link to the city of Berlin. On 11 December 2009, the decision was made in favour of Willy Brandt. The Nobel Peace laureate of 1971 served as mayor of West Berlin from 1957 to 1966 and as West German chancellor from 1969 to 1974. Berlin mayor Klaus Wowereit and Minister-President of Brandenburg Matthias Platzeck, both members of the SPD (which Brandt led from 1964 to 1987) led the effort to add Brandt's name to the airport.

Other suggested honorees included Claus Schenk Graf von Stauffenberg, Albert Einstein and Marlene Dietrich (suggested by members of the Christian Democratic Union), Gustav Stresemann (nominated by the Free Democratic Party), and Otto Lilienthal (advocated by the Green Party).

As a result of the ongoing problems affecting the airport and the continuous negative publicity it got in the German and international press, the  considered revoking the airport's permission to bear the former chancellor's name. This is due to concerns that an ongoing association might be considered disrespectful towards his legacy. However, no such measure has been taken so far.

Construction progress and issues

The construction of Berlin Brandenburg Airport suffered from continued delays which were caused by many issues.

The most significant cause for the continuing delays was the fire protection and alarm system. In the terminal building, the system was not built according to the construction permit and failed the mandatory acceptance test necessary to open the airport. FBB proposed an interim solution employing up to 700 human fire spotters, which the building supervision department of the local Dahme-Spreewald district rejected. Inspectors uncovered flaws in the wiring, programming and implementation of the highly complex system designed by Siemens and Bosch. The system automatically controls sprinklers, smoke extractors and fire doors. For aesthetic reasons, designers decided that the terminal would have smoke extraction ducts in its ceiling but that they would not exhaust to its rooftop. During a fire, smoke would be pumped from the ceiling into a shaft running down and through the basement below the structure. This required the natural rising behaviour of hot air in the shaft to be reversed. Achieving this on the scale necessary for this airport is a unique undertaking and so far this elaborate smoke extraction system has not worked as planned. To meet the acceptance test requirements, large scale reconstruction work of the fire system might be needed. It emerged that Alfredo di Mauro, who designed the fire safety system, was not a qualified engineer. While his business card stated he was an engineer, he was actually qualified as an engineering draughtsman. Di Mauro was dismissed by the airport company in early May 2014. In the termination notice, the company cited "serious defects" in his work and that trust in their relationship was "now finally shattered." The airport company went on to state that Di Mauro's plans would be "disposed of." The system was to be rebuilt and divided into three areas to make it "manageable." The cost of this work was reported as being a nine-digit figure.

Another major factor impacting on the construction of the airport was insolvency of general planner Planungsgemeinschaft Flughafen Berlin Brandenburg International (pg bbi) and the temporary dismissal of the Gerkan, Marg and Partners architects. Inspectors have uncovered many examples of poor workmanship due to a lack of proper supervision and documentation, most notably concerning the wiring. Reports have surfaced about cable conduits that hold too many cables or hold cables in incompatible combinations, such as phone lines next to high voltage wires. To correct this, demolition of numerous walls was deemed necessary. Exterior vents appeared to be in improper locations, allowing rainwater from the western facade to enter them.

The airport finally received its operating licence in May 2020, allowing an opening date to be set. The local and aviation authorities then gave final approval for the airport to open on 31 October 2020. Plans to advance the closure of Tegel to June 2020 in the wake of the COVID-19 pandemic were halted due to an estimated lack of capacity at Schönefeld's old facilities.

From August 2020, the procedure to move all equipment from both current airports to their new facilities commenced.

On 15 October 2020, all test runs of the airport's passenger facilities and procedures, which included thousands of volunteers since spring, concluded successfully after being slightly delayed by the COVID-19 pandemic.

After Schönefeld's facilities formally became Terminal 5 of BER ahead on 25 October 2020, all airlines moved from Tegel to BER between 31 October and 8 November 2020.  The first flight to land at the new airport was an easyJet special service from Tegel on 31 October 2020, followed shortly after by a Lufthansa special service from Munich. Lufthansa applied a special "Hauptstadtflieger" (capital city flyer) sticker to the aircraft in celebration of the flight. The first departure from the new Terminal 1 was a flight to London–Heathrow on 1 November 2020.

Terminals

Terminal 1
The U-shaped main terminal building of Berlin Brandenburg Airport, named Terminal 1 and consisting of sections A, B (01-25), C and D, was designed by gmp architects. They are the same company that designed the hexagonal Terminal A at Tegel Airport, which opened in 1974. At BER, the terminal sits between the two runways, creating a so-called midfield airport above the underground train station. The terminal has four public levels, designated 0, 1, 2 and 3.

The check-in area is located in the public area at Level 1 and houses 118 counters organised in eight clusters, called check-in isles. Planners anticipate that a significant number of passengers will use the more than 100 self check-in machines that will be installed. Additionally, by May 2015, two extensions had been added to both sides of the main check-in area, containing 12 more check-in counters and eight security lanes each to avoid overcrowding of the main hall.

The airside area will be accessible only to ticketed and screened passengers. Securitas Germany will staff the 35 screening stations. BER is equipped with 25 jet bridges with another 85 aircraft stands on the apron. The main pier contains 16 jet-bridges; all but one have two levels, thus, separating arriving and departing passengers. Level 1 is intended for Schengen Area passengers (gates A01–A20, B01–B20), while Level 2 (gates C01–C19, D01–D17) is for non-Schengen passengers. Eight of the gates can accommodate wide-body aircraft, and one gate has been designed to accommodate the Airbus A380. The apron has sufficient space to allow installation of a dual jetway allowing a quick boarding and disembarking process. A mezzanine (Level Z) at gates A21–22 and B21 allows for additional pre-boarding security checks for high-risk flights to the United States and Israel. Lufthansa operates an airport lounge at the north end of the main pier (gate B20), which will also be open for passengers of the respective alliance partners. An airport-operated lounge is located at the south end of the main pier (gate A20), which is contracted by most of the non-Star Alliance carriers operating from T1.

The south pier was reserved for near-exclusive use of defunct Air Berlin and its Oneworld partners. The south terminal contains nine single-storey jet bridges (gates A30–A38). The north pier features a more minimalist design compared to the other two piers. This is to meet the demands of low-cost carriers and has no jetbridges but boarding gates (B30–45) with direct apron access.

Major operators at Terminal 1 are easyJet, the Lufthansa Group, Air France, British Airways, Turkish Airlines, United Airlines and Qatar Airways, amongst others.

Terminal 2
Plans for a separate low-cost airline terminal costing €200 million were released in March 2016. Construction for the now-named Terminal 2 with section B (30–45) (which was originally constructed as part of Terminal 1) began in 2018 and finished in time in September 2020 to provide further capacity especially for low-cost carriers. Terminal 2 is constructed as a more basic-departures-and-arrivals facility next to the Terminal 1 main building, directly connected with its northern pier to gain more check-in capacity while sharing the same airside areas.

Originally Eurowings was supposed to operate their Berlin base out of Terminal 2. However, due to the COVID-19 pandemic, the facility remained closed, as the capacity was not needed for the foreseeable future. Until then, all flights were handled in Terminal 1.

In November 2021 it had been announced that Terminal 2 was planned to be opened by April 2022 to relieve Terminal 1 as demand for aviation has picked up; thus, Terminal 1 had capacity issues. Terminal 2 was opened on 24 March 2022 with Ryanair as the primary tenant, but in the same year in November Wizz Air has also moved its operations to the new terminal, while the original intended user of the facility Eurowings remained in Terminal 1.

Terminal 5
Terminal 5 was made up of the former terminal facilities of old Berlin Schönefeld Airport, which were refurbished and renamed from sections A, B, C, and D to K, L, Q, and M, respectively. In 2019, it was decided to leave the old facilities operational to provide more capacity for the expected passenger volume. The old tarmac at Schönefeld, which was refurbished and upgraded, was also used. Terminal 5, which was located on the north side of the airport, was connected with the central areas of the airport (Terminals 1 and 2) solely landside by the S-Bahn and public transit buses between the new airport station and the old station that formerly served Schönefeld Airport.

Terminal 5 was scheduled to be operated until the inauguration of the planned Terminal 3 by 2030. In November 2020, it was announced that Terminal 5 would be shut down temporarily due to low passenger volume in the wake of the COVID-19 pandemic, with all flights relocating to the main Terminal 1. The terminal was closed until further notice on 22 February 2021 and was, at the time of closure, considered to no longer reopen again. In January 2021, a vaccination center opened at Terminal 5 to administer COVID-19 vaccines. The vaccination center remained open after the closure of the terminal to flights.

In March 2022, Terminal 5 was converted into a makeshift shelter to house refugees fleeing Ukraine.

Airport overview

Runways
Berlin Brandenburg Airport has two parallel runways.

The northern runway of BER is the southern runway of the old Schönefeld Airport and has been in use since the 1960s. Blackouts of the runway beacon of the southern runway led to investigations concerning air traffic safety.

BER covers 1,470 hectares (3,632 acres) of land.

Air traffic control

The Deutsche Flugsicherung is responsible for air traffic control and apron control at Berlin Brandenburg Airport. At , the control tower is the third highest in Germany (only surpassed by Munich Airport and Düsseldorf Airport). On 25 March 2012, the new tower opened replacing the former facility at Schönefeld. Technical control (power supply and IT) went into operation on 16 March 2018.

Cargo and general aviation
The general aviation terminal is located in the northern part of BER.

Airport tourism facilities
The Infotower was a  observation tower located adjacent to the northern cargo terminal that included a museum and a gift shop. It was closed and demolished in 2016. FBB also offers guided tours of the airport which have grown in popularity since the delayed opening.

Aircraft maintenance
The two large hangars at BER were to be used by Lufthansa and Air Berlin respectively. However, Air Berlin have ceased operations as of 28 October 2017. Both provide enough space for maintenance work on four to five narrow-body aircraft.

Government use
The Executive Transport Wing of the German Defence Ministry (Flugbereitschaft), responsible for government flights, will move large parts of its operations to Berlin Brandenburg Airport from its still-current base at Cologne Bonn Airport near Germany's former capital Bonn. It operates a fleet of Bombardier Global Express, Airbus A319, Airbus A321, Airbus A340-300 and Airbus A350-900 VIP-configured aircraft. However Cologne/Bonn will remain the home base of the government fleet for the time being.

The Institute for Federal Real Estate has been planning to construct a terminal on the northern edge of the airport for use by government officials and to welcome foreign dignitaries during state visits. The former Terminal A of Schönefeld Airport was planned to serve as an interim terminal until the new building was to be finished. However, in March 2016 the management of the airport terminated the contract with the German government that guaranteed usage of Terminal A of Schönefeld Airport upon the completion of BER for the area to be used for a different purpose. The termination was disputed between airport officials and the German Federal Ministry of Transport and Digital Infrastructure.

Mühlenfeld suggested a provisional ramp area west of Schönefeld's main terminal as a replacement solution and construction site for an interim government terminal at the end of February 2016. This then supposed interim government terminal was finished at a cost of around €70 million while the permanent government terminal was planned to begin operations around 2025, at a cost of additionally around €344 million, which left its completion in doubt. In December 2019, the German government cancelled all plans to construct a more representative facility until at least 2030.

The government terminal was inaugurated and put in use on 21 October 2020.

Operating hours
Noise abatement regulations in the airport's operating licence prohibit takeoffs and landings between 00:00 and 05:00. The Federal Administrative Court of Germany rejected a lawsuit by residents to extend this night flight ban from 23:00 to 06:00 on 13 October 2011. It was also ruled that affected residents should be provided with additional noise insulation.

Major operators
Until its demise, Air Berlin had planned to move its primary hub from Tegel to Berlin Brandenburg. As a member of the Oneworld airline alliance, Air Berlin required airport facilities capable of meeting the demands of its connecting passengers that Tegel could not provide. However, Air Berlin filed for insolvency on 15 August 2017 and large parts of it were bought by Lufthansa, Germany's largest airline, ahead of its collapse on the 27th of that month. The airport leadership declared in September 2017 that the bankruptcy of Air Berlin would have had no imminent impact on the expected traffic volume at the new airport as several of Air Berlin's routes had been taken over by other airlines, e.g., easyJet.

Prior to the COVID-19 pandemic in early 2020, easyJet was due to become the overall largest airline at the airport in terms of routes served, ahead of Ryanair. In May 2019, Ryanair announced that they would not move to the new facilities, and would keep using the old building at the side of Berlin Schönefeld Airport, which has now become part of Berlin Brandenburg Airport as its Terminal 5. As of 2021, Ryanair remained in the new main building due to Terminal 5 being closed for the foreseeable future.

Lufthansa does not use Berlin Brandenburg Airport as a hub. By 2011, they planned to greatly expand its presence in Berlin. At its former facilities at Tegel Airport the airline added several European destinations which have all since ceased or were turned over to Eurowings.

The impact of the COVID-19 pandemic on the airport's already sparse long-haul operations is still ongoing. As of summer 2020, eight destinations in the US, Asia, and the Middle East were supposed to be served, but various connections were then terminated or never began due to the travel restrictions. Some routes, such as to Singapore with Scoot, have since resumed. In 2021, the airport authority sought to establish 25 long-haul routes from Berlin by 2025 including negotiations for a revised bilateral agreement to allow Emirates to serve a fifth German city. United Airlines announced its return to Berlin with a service to Newark, which already had been served from Tegel, as well as a new route to Washington, D.C., in 2023. In July 2022, Delta Air Lines announced its 2023 return to Berlin with a service to New York–Kennedy, which it had last served from Tegel from 2017 to 2019.

Projected passenger volume and expansion plans
Since German reunification, air traffic in Berlin has increased greatly. In 1991, the combined passenger volume of the city's airports was 7.9 million per year. By 2014, this number had risen to 28 million. By Berlin Brandenburg's opening, it was projected to have a capacity of 27 million passengers per year. There are concerns that the airport will have insufficient capacity upon opening and plans are already in place for expansion. It may be expanded by up to two satellite concourses, bringing the terminal capacity to 45 million with runways capable of accommodating 50 million passengers per year. The two satellites located on the apron parallel to the main pier and linked by tunnel, are included in the construction permit of Berlin Brandenburg Airport. This means they could be built at any time without further regulatory hurdles or the possibility of third-party objections. A possible third runway could be located in the south, though no such plans exist to date.

Airlines and destinations

Passenger
The following airlines operate regular scheduled and charter flights at Berlin Brandenburg Airport:

Cargo

Statistics

Annual traffic

In 2019, the two Berlin operational airports together served 35.6 million passengers, which sharply decreased to 9 million for 2020 in the wake of the COVID-19-pandemic. In 2021, Berlin Brandenburg Airport slightly increased that figure to 9.9 million passengers.

Ground transportation

Rail

As the nine tunnel sections were the first structures to be built, they were constructed by conventional excavations.

BER Airport – Terminal 1-2 station has six tracks and forms the lowest level of Terminal 1–2. Two tracks serve as a terminus for the S-Bahn – with the S9 serving the Stadtbahn and the S45 serving the southern Ringbahn. The other four tracks handle EuroCity, InterCity, Intercity-Express and Regional-Express trains. The Terminal 5 complex is served by BER Airport – Terminal 5 station which previously served the former Schönefeld Airport.

Deutsche Bahn confirmed in August 2011 that multiple daily Intercity-Express and InterCity trains will connect the airport to Bielefeld, Hannover, Hamburg, Dresden, Leipzig, Halle and Wolfsburg. EuroCity trains will also connect to Wrocław and Kraków in Poland, Amsterdam in the Netherlands and Prague in the Czech Republic.

About half of the passengers are expected to access BER by rail. An express line (Regionalbahn) will connect the airport with the Berlin Hauptbahnhof (Berlin main station) in 30 minutes. Two more stops at Potsdamer Platz and Berlin Südkreuz will be part of the Airport Express, which is planned to make the trip in 20 minutes. As of 2019, rebuilding the Berlin–Dresden railway that would allow the 20-minute trip to Hauptbahnhof is expected to finish in 2025. Until then, the express train will run via Berlin-Gesundbrunnen and Ostkreuz.

According to the district administrator of Dahme-Spreewald, train rides from southern Brandenburg towards BER might be complicated and require changing trains. He suggested a new rail concept might be necessary. Final construction permission for the railway station was granted on 26 March 2018. The final permit for Dresdner Bahn construction was granted on 13 September 2019.

Proposed expansions
U-Bahn
Line U7 terminates short of the airport (at Rudow) but there are plans to extend it towards the airport if and when funds become available. The issue is complicated by the fact that the line would have to cross the state border between Berlin and Brandenburg and it is unclear who would have to pay for which parts of construction operations and maintenance. While Berlin has many "ghost stations" built in preparation for potential future construction, there is no provision underneath the terminal building for a station.

Magnetic levitation railway
In June 2020, the CDU Berlin (then in opposition at the state level) proposed building a Maglev of the Transport System Bögl (developed by the Bavarian construction company Max Bögl) to the airport.

Road

Berlin Brandenburg Airport is connected by its own exit to the A113. The road carries traffic into Berlin to the A100 and out to the A10 where it continues south as the A13 in the direction of Dresden. The highway 96a along the north side of the airport is being expanded to four lanes towards Potsdam.

Four car parks and a car rental centre will be completed by the opening of BER. Around 10,000 parking spaces will be available in four multi-storey car parks.

A study released in September 2016 attested that BER will double the amount of vehicular traffic, causing frequent traffic jams on the Autobahn once the airport opens. The A100 and A113 do not have enough lanes to support the expected volume of traffic. The approach to BER was deemed insufficient for the expected traffic and will lead to heavy congestion on the highways throughout south-central Berlin. There are also concerns about increased accidents and air pollution.
Congestion is expected to be high in tunnels leading to the airport, causing frequent closings of the Britz tunnel on the A100.

Over 10% of passengers are expected to come from Poland, also thanks to upgraded highways on the Polish side of the border. It is hoped that these upgrades will make the airport accessible for air travellers from the western regions of that country.

Bus
Public transport connections at the new airport  include numerous bus services. BER is served by the express buses X7, X71 and X11. The X7 connects to the U7 subway at Rudow station. X71 connects the airport to Alt Mariendorf along the U6 via Rudow. The X11 bus continues to Lichterfelde-West and to Dahlem. There are also special express buses costing a surcharge dubbed "BER1" and "BER2" which connect the airport with Rathaus Steglitz and Potsdam main station respectively. Other bus lines also stop at a number of stations, providing connections with Berlin's public transport network and destinations in Brandenburg.

Bicycle
The access to the airport by bicycle is considered lacking by the local ADFC who demand a bicycle highway to the new airport. A reason cited for the lacking bicycle access is that the plans dating to 2006 made no such provision.

Commercial and exposition area

Berlin Air Show (ILA)

On 3 July 2012, the Berlin ExpoCenter Airport opened on the southeastern portion of the airport grounds. Messe Berlin operates the  exposition facility that is primarily intended as the site of the biennial ILA Berlin Air Show.

Airport Information Centre
Coinciding with groundbreaking for construction of the new airport, an information and public relations centre called airportworld opened near the old Schönefeld Airport. On 14 November 2007, the Infotower, a  public viewing tower containing an exhibition about the new airport opened on the BER construction site.

Business park
The area surrounding BER is zoned as a commercial district. Plans call for the construction of shopping centres and parking structures as well as industrial, commercial and office spaces. Marketing of the real estate began in autumn 2006 and beginning in 2009 offices, hotels, car rentals, four car parks with a capacity of 10,000, restaurants and retail spaces were built here.

A further Business Park North was proposed as a future use of the area of the old Schönefeld terminal. However, those plans were put on hold due to the decision to incorporate the terminal into the new airport.

Controversies
In September 2010, Deutsche Flugsicherung published aircraft arrival and departure routes for Berlin Brandenburg Airport which significantly differ from earlier ones used in the court decision for the construction permit. In the original maps, aircraft were expected to take off and land in a path parallel with the runway. The new plans saw flight paths that deviate from the runway direction by 15 degrees. Therefore, aircraft would now fly over areas in southern Berlin (Lichtenrade, Steglitz and Zehlendorf) and adjacent Brandenburg (Teltow, Stahnsdorf, Kleinmachnow and Potsdam) to the surprise of local residents. This prompted a wave of protests and a lawsuit that the courts rejected.

Both the expansion of Schönefeld Airport into BER and the quality of the connection to the railway network are the subject of public debate. The Bürgerverein Brandenburg-Berlin e.V. represents local residents who protest an expansion of air traffic to and from the south of Berlin. Also, traffic and environmental experts criticise the late completion dates for the fast connection to the Berlin Hauptbahnhof. Still, Berlin Hauptbahnhof will be only a 30-minute journey with trains departing every 15 minutes upon inauguration. At the time of the originally planned opening date of BER, in 2011, this was expected to be reduced to 20 minutes after reconstruction of the Berlin section of the Berlin–Dresden railway, which was planned to be finished by 2020. However, delays in both the BER construction and the construction of the railway meant that the travel time will be 30 minutes until at least 2025.

In May 2016, it emerged that a whistle blower on the airport project, who had alerted the public to major corruption within the project, had been poisoned with a "deadly substance" but survived after a three-month period of illness.

See also
 List of airports in Germany
 List of the busiest airports in Germany
 List of transport megaprojects
 Megaproject
 Transport in Germany

References

Further reading

External links

2020 establishments in Germany
Airports established in 2020
Airports in Berlin
Airports in Brandenburg
Buildings and structures in Berlin
Dahme-Spreewald
Gerkan, Marg and Partners buildings
Controversies in Germany